The 1963 Women's Western Open was contested from June 20–23 at Maple Bluff Country Club. It was the 34th edition of the Women's Western Open.

This event was won by Mickey Wright.

Final leaderboard

External links
Pittsburgh Post-Gazette source

Women's Western Open
Golf in Wisconsin
Women's Western Open
Women's Western Open
Women's Western Open
Women's Western Open
Women's sports in Wisconsin